Lee Constantine Elia (born July 16, 1937) is an American former professional baseball infielder, who played only sparingly in Major League Baseball (MLB) for the Chicago White Sox and Chicago Cubs. Following his playing career, he managed the Cubs (–) and Philadelphia Phillies (–), and served as a coach for the Phillies, New York Yankees, Toronto Blue Jays, Tampa Bay Devil Rays, Baltimore Orioles, and Seattle Mariners. Elia was hired by the Atlanta Braves as a special assistant to general manager Frank Wren in November, 2010.

Early life
Elia was born on July 16, 1937, in Philadelphia, Pennsylvania, to Constantine and Florence (Soulas) Elia.  His father, Connie Elia, was born in Albania and emigrated to the United States in 1920. He worked as a supervisor for a food service for 30 years. Elia also grew up with a younger sister, Diane. Elia graduated from Olney High School in Philadelphia and the University of Delaware.

Playing career
Elia played most of his career through the minor league system. He was signed by his hometown team the Philadelphia Phillies in 1958 as a shortstop. He played eleven seasons in the minor leagues and nine of those seasons being in AAA. He played in the Phillies minor league system for six years, totaling 72 home runs, about 300 runs batted in (RBI) and a .260 combined batting average. He was then signed by the Chicago White Sox organization in 1965. He played out the entire 1965 season in AAA, and began the 1966 season in AAA as well, before being called up to the Major Leagues. He was on the roster with the Chicago White Sox for 80 games in the 1966 season, and played in 77 of those. He played shortstop in 75 of those games. That season he hit .205 with three home runs and 22 RBI. That 1966 White Sox team finished fourth in the American League with a record of 83–79. The following season he was dealt to the National League's Chicago Cubs. He played the 1967 season in the minors and finished with 14 home runs, 59 RBI and a batting average of .267. The following season he was called up to the Cubs major league roster, only appearing in fifteen games racking up only three RBI and a .176 batting average. After the season, he played in twenty AAA games, three with the Cubs and seventeen with the Yankees. Shortly after he stopped playing baseball before coming back at the age of 35 in 1973 and playing AAA ball with the Phillies. However, he only appeared in 16 games and retired after. He was efficient in the field with a career fielding percentage of about .940.

Coaching career
Elia was hired as a bench coach for the 1980 and 1981 Philadelphia Phillies major league team. They finished the season NL East Champions with a 91–71 record, one game ahead of the Montreal Expos. That season he helped lead the Phillies under manager Dallas Green to the peak of all the sport, a 1980 World Series Championship. The following year in 1981 the Phillies finished with a 59–48 record. They won the NL East first half with a 34–21 record, however, finished third in the second half with a 25–27 record. They still qualified for the playoffs however and were matched up with the NL East second-half winners, the Montreal Expos. The series went to all five games and the Expos knocked out the defending Champions 3–2 in the NLDS.  Some notable players he coached in these two years with the Phillies include Larry Bowa, Pete Rose, Mike Schmidt, and Ryne Sandberg.

Elia was hired once again as a Phillies bench coach in 1985 and 1986. In 1985 his Phillies finished 75-87, which was fifth in the NL East. Then in 1986 they finished 86–75, good for second place in the NL East however they finished a remarkable 21.5  games back of the New York Mets who were 108–54. Elia was still a bench coach through the first 61 games of the 1987 season, but the Phillies were 29–32 at that point and manager John Felske had been fired mid-season. Elia was hired as the replacement manager.

Elia was a New York Yankees coach in 1989.

Since ending his managing career he has worked as many different smaller positions within organizations. He was a special assistant to the manager, scout, and hitting coach with the Seattle Mariners. After that, he was a special assistant to the general manager, and scout for the Los Angeles Dodgers. He was also a bench coach and scout in the Baltimore Orioles organization.

Managerial career
In 1975, at the age of 37, Elia had begun his managing career in the Western Carolinas League with the Class A Spartanburg Phillies. After his first season of managing he led his team to a league best 81–59 record. The following season the team took a bit of a nosedive and finished with a 59–80 record. In the 1977 season, Elia was promoted as the manager of the Double-A Reading Phillies in the Eastern League. He managed his team to a 63–75 finish, which was good for third place in the Can-Am Division. Notable players he managed on this team were future 1980 World Series champions Kevin Saucier and Keith Moreland. During the 1978 season, Elia remained head man in Reading and turned it around significantly. They finished the 1978 season with a 79–57 record, which was good for second in the league and only 1.5 games back of the first place Yankees. In 1979, he was named manager of the Phillies Triple-A affiliate, the Oklahoma City 89ers. The 89ers finished with a 72–63 record and won the west division. They went on to play the Evansville Triplets (Detroit Tigers affiliate) in the American Association Championship Series. They lost the series in six games as the Jim Leyland led Evansville team won the league. A notable player on this roster was Lonnie Smith, who was a 1982 All Star and a three-time World Series champion left fielder.

In 1982, at the age of 44, Elia was hired as the manager of the Chicago Cubs. He was hired by Dallas Green, who had been his manager the previous two years in Philadelphia. That season they brought players such as Ryne Sandberg, Keith Moreland, and Dickie Noles over from the Phillies roster. They finished the season with a 73–89 record and finished fifth out of six in the NL East.

Elia is often remembered for a infamously profanity-filled tirade directed at the fans at Wrigley Field on April 29, 1983. After the Cubs dropped a one-run game at home to the Los Angeles Dodgers, Elia lost his temper while making post-game remarks to four reporters (the Chicago Tribune's Robert Marcus, the Chicago Sun-Times Joel Behrig, the Daily Herald's Don Friske and WLS-AM's Les Grobstein, who recorded it with the only microphone that was in the room). During this tirade Elia vented his feelings about Cubs fans in the stands who were booing and heckling Chicago:

After being fired by the Cubs, he was hired as manager for the Triple-A Portland Beavers (Phillies organization) in the Pacific Coast League. Elia's tenure in Portland is perhaps best remembered for his role in an unusual incident during a May 30, 1984, game against the Vancouver Canadians. Elia was ejected for arguing a called third strike and subsequently threw a chair onto the field before leaving the dugout; this in turn led to the ejection of the team's batboy, Sam Morris, when he refused (acting on instructions from Beavers players in the dugout) umpire Pam Postema's demand that he retrieve the chair that Elia had thrown on the field. Elia led the Beavers to a 62–78 record. He was hired as a bench coach for the Phillies the next season.

In 1987, 61 games into the season, Elia was hired as manager for the 29–32 Phillies. He proceeded to lead the team to an 80–82 record to finish fourth in the NL East. The team was 51–50 that season once he took over as manager. He remained the head man in 1988, but a very disappointing season led to his firing once again as manager. They finished with a 65–96 record and that was good for last place in the NL East.

Elia was named manager of the Clearwater Phillies for the 1990 and 1991. In his first season, he led the team to a 50–87 record. In the following season, he made a dramatic turnaround with the team as they finished with an 81–49 record.

In 1992, at age 54, he was hired as the manager of the Phillies Triple-A affiliate, the Scranton/Wilkes-Barre Red Barons of the International League. He led the team to an 84–58 record before retiring from being a manager.

Awards
Elia was inducted into the Pennsylvania Sports Hall of Fame in 2000.

Personal life
Elia resides in Odessa, Florida, with his second wife Priscilla, and his two daughters, Tana and Ashley. He is the uncle of Olympic swimmer Frank Leskaj, the first Albanian-American to represent Albania in the Olympics.

References

External links

Lee Elia at Baseball Almanac
Lee Elia at Baseball Gauge
ESPN.com article: Elia's tirade becomes part of Cubs' lore

1937 births
Living people
American people of Albanian descent
Arkansas Travelers players
Baltimore Orioles coaches
Buffalo Bisons (minor league) players
Chattanooga Lookouts players
Chicago Cubs managers
Chicago Cubs players
Chicago White Sox players
Elmira Pioneers players
Eugene Emeralds players
Indianapolis Indians players
Major League Baseball bench coaches
Major League Baseball hitting coaches
New York Yankees coaches
Baseball players from Philadelphia
Philadelphia Phillies coaches
Philadelphia Phillies managers
Philadelphia Phillies scouts
Portland Beavers managers
Reading Phillies managers
Syracuse Chiefs players
Tacoma Cubs players
Tampa Bay Devil Rays coaches
Williamsport Grays players
Seattle Mariners coaches
People from Odessa, Florida